Wang Xiaozhu (born 15 May 1973) is a Chinese archer.

She competed at 1992 Summer Olympics where she won a silver medal in women's team event and came 4th place in women's individual. At the 1996 Summer Olympics she finished 7th in the individual event and 6th in the team event.

She competed at the 1994 Asian Games where she won a gold medal in the women's team event and at the 1998 Asian Games where she won a silver medal in the women's team event.

References

1973 births
Living people
Olympic silver medalists for China
Olympic medalists in archery
Chinese female archers
Asian Games medalists in archery
Archers at the 1994 Asian Games
Archers at the 1998 Asian Games
Archers at the 1992 Summer Olympics
Archers at the 1996 Summer Olympics
Olympic archers of China
Asian Games gold medalists for China
Asian Games silver medalists for China
Medalists at the 1994 Asian Games
Medalists at the 1998 Asian Games
Medalists at the 1992 Summer Olympics
20th-century Chinese women